The Factories Act 1948 was an Act of Parliament passed in the United Kingdom by the Labour government of Clement Attlee. It was passed with the intention of safeguarding the health of workers. It extended the age limits for the medical examination of persons entering factory employment, while also including male workers in the regulations for providing seats and issuing extensive new building regulations.

Under the legislation, young persons under the age of eighteen became subject to medical examination not only on entry to the place of work, but annually thereafter. Certificates of fitness were also made a requirement for young people employed in the loading, unloading and coaling of ships and other kinds of work in ships on harbour or wet dock, engineering construction and building operations as well as for factory employees.

Notes

See also
Factories Act,1948, India

United Kingdom Acts of Parliament 1948